Hector Durville (1849–1923) was a French occultist and magnetizer. He is the father of Henri Durville

Durville directed the Journal of Magnetism, which had been founded by Baron du Potet.  He founded a number of occult institutions including:
 The University of High Studies, Paris.  It consisted of the faculties of Hermetic Sciences, Magnetic Sciences and Spirit Sciences.
 The Practical School of Magnetism, Mozart Avenue, Paris.
 The Eudiaque Order, an initiate spiritual society, where the main objective consisted in magnifying the human person.  Followers investigated animal magnetism and the effects of hypnosis.

Books

 The Mysteries of Eleusis
 Magnétisme Personnel ou Psyquique, 1890 (Digital copy)
 Les Actions Psychiques à Distance
 Pour devenir Magnétiseur, 1890.

External links
 Les Durville — Famille de magnétiseurs et d'occultistes (in French).

French occultists
19th-century occultists
1849 births
1923 deaths